Thalfingen (b Ulm) station is a railway station in the town of Elchingen, located in Bayern, Germany. It is owned and operated by Deutsche Bahn. The station lies on the Brenz Railway and the train services are operated by Hohenzollerische Landesbahn.

Train services 
The station is served by the following services:

References

External links 
Thalfingen station on bahnhof.de
Ost